Elise McAbee Saunders (July 28, 1920 – May 9, 1991) was an American materials engineer with the United States Army.

Early life and education 
McAbee was from Orange County, New York, the daughter of Daniel Hayes McAbee and Ruth E. Edgecomb McAbee. She earned a degree in chemical engineering at West Virginia University in 1942.

Career 
McAbee worked in the Army's Plastics and Packaging Laboratory at Picatinny Arsenal in New Jersey. She and her colleagues won the Army Research & Development Achievement Award in 1965. Her research on plastics, polymers, and adhesives was published in academic journals including The Journal of Adhesion and The Journal of Applied Polymer Science.

Selected publications 

 "Use of multiple regression analysis to develop predictive models for failure times of adhesive bonds at constant stress" (1974, with William C. Jones, Raymond F. Wegman, and David W. Levi)
 "Failure of Adhesive Bonds at Constant Strain Rates" (1972, with Michael J. Bodnar, William C. Tanner, and David W. Levi)
 "Application of Superposition Techniques to Thermal Degradation of Epoxide Resins" (1971, with H. T. Lee and David W. Levi)
 "Use of a Reaction Rate Method to Predict Failure Times of Adhesive Bonds at Constant Stress" (1970 with David W. Levi)
 "Relation between the Tensile Modulus of Propellants and the Failure Time" (1970, with David W. Levi)
 "Prediction of Failure Times for Some Adhesive-Bonded Joints" (1970, with William C. Tanner and David W. Levi)
 "Prediction of mechanical properties of polymers. Tensile strength of glass-reinforced plastics" (1969, with David W. Levi)
 "Prediction of Lifetimes of Nylon Samples at Various Stress Levels" (1969, with David W. Levi)
 "Treatment of propellant mechanical property data by reaction rate analysis" (1967, with David W. Levi)
 "Effect of Temperature and Rate of Loading on the Tensile Properties of Glass-Reinforced Polyester" (1964, with Mitchel Chmura)
 "Tensile Properties of Double-Base Propellants" (1962, with Mitchel Chmura)
 "High-Rate Tensile Properties of Plastics" (1961, with Mitchel Chmura)
 "Effect of Testing Rate and Type of Machine on Tensile Properties Data for Plastics" (1958)

Personal life 
Elise McAbee married John Everitt Saunders in 1973. She died in 1991, in Bexar County, Texas, aged 70 years.

References 

1920 births
1991 deaths
American women engineers
West Virginia University alumni
People from Orange County, New York